Samsung Galaxy Xcover Pro is an Android-based smartphone designed and manufactured by Samsung. The phone was announced and released in January 2020.

References 

Samsung Galaxy
Android (operating system) devices
Mobile phones introduced in 2020
Mobile phones with user-replaceable battery